The Regional Council of Aosta Valley is the legislative assembly of the autonomous region of Aosta Valley.

The assembly was founded on 29 December 1945 and its first members were selected by the central directions of the parties and approved by the Council of Ministers. The first election of the Council were held instead on 24 April 1949.

Composition
The Regional Council was composed (2018-2020) of the following political groups:

See also
Regional council
Politics of Aosta Valley
President of Aosta Valley

References

External links
Regional Council of Aosta Valley

Politics of Aosta Valley
Italian Regional Councils
Aosta Valley